Gary Arthur (born January 9, 1948) is a former American football tight end. He played for the New York Jets from 1970 to 1971.

References

1948 births
Living people
Players of American football from Dayton, Ohio
American football tight ends
Miami RedHawks football players
New York Jets players